Floran Douay (born February 7, 1995) is a French professional ice hockey player who is currently playing for the SCL Tigers of the National League (NL). Douay also plays for the French national team.

Douay played all of his junior hockey in Switzerland which allows him to compete in the National League with a Swiss player-license.

Playing career
Douay made his National League debut with Genève-Servette HC during the 2013-14 season, playing 2 games with the team. He only became a regular for Geneva in the 2015-16 season playing all 50 regular season games and scoring 11 points. Douay was also loaned to multiple teams in the Swiss League (SL) to help him develop his game.

On May 8, 2018, Douay signed a two-year contract extension with Geneva through the 2019/20 season. On December 21, 2018, Douay was badly hit by fellow Frenchman Johann Morant in a game against EV Zug and was immediately taken out of the game. He underwent MRI the next day to reveal ACL and meniscus tear. Douay had to undergo surgery which ended his season.

On August 30, 2019, Douay was signed to an early three-year contract extension by Geneva through the 2022/23 season. Douay was loaned to HC Ambrì-Piotta along with Geneva's teammate, Marco Miranda, for the 2019 Spengler Cup. He played all 3 games and put up 2 assists as Ambri-Piotta fell in OT to Ocelari Trinec in the semi finals.

On August 23, 2020, Douay was traded -along with Guillaume Maillard- to Lausanne HC in exchange for Tyler Moy.

Douay began the 2022/23 season on loan with HC Sierre of the SL before Lausanne HC decided to terminate his contract on October 10, 2022. That same day he was signed to a one-year deal with the SCL Tigers for the remainder of the 2022/23 season.

International play
He participated at the 2017 IIHF World Championship and the 2018 IIHF World Championship, representing Team France.

References

External links

1995 births
Living people
HC Ajoie players
French ice hockey forwards
French expatriate ice hockey people
French expatriate sportspeople in Switzerland
Genève-Servette HC players
HC La Chaux-de-Fonds players
Lausanne HC players
HC Red Ice players
SCL Tigers players
HC Sierre players